Andrew Leavine (born December 27, 1987) is an American retired professional wrestler. In 2011, Leavine won the Tough Enough contest to earn a contract with World Wrestling Entertainment (WWE); he went on to wrestle for WWE's developmental territory, Florida Championship Wrestling, under the ring name Kevin Hackman. He is also known for his appearances with World Wrestling Council (WWC) where he held the WWC Universal Heavyweight Championship.

Professional wrestling career

World Wrestling Entertainment (2010–2012) 
In 2010, Leavine signed a developmental contract with World Wrestling Entertainment (WWE) and was assigned to the Florida Championship Wrestling (FCW), belonging to WWE's developmental territory. Under the ring name of Kevin Hackman, Leavine only took part in a couple of matches before being released in February 2011 to participate in Tough Enough.

In March 2011, Leavine was announced as one of the fourteen contestants for the revival of WWE Tough Enough. Leavine was not regarded as one of the front runners at the beginning of the show but ended strongly and made it to the final two with Luke Robinson. He was announced as the winner of Tough Enough on the June 6 episode of Raw by Stone Cold Steve Austin who gave him a Stone Cold Stunner after being slapped by Vince McMahon, as a welcoming gift from the WWE. Leavine also appeared on Raw the following week, on June 13, in a backstage segment with Austin and CM Punk. He then returned to FCW.

Leavine confirmed in an interview on WWE's official website in June 2011 that he would be training in FCW. In April 2012, Leavine was released from WWE.

World Wrestling Council (2012–2014) 
After his release, Leavine started working for World Wrestling Council (WWC), a wrestling territory in Puerto Rico owned by Carlos Colon. On September 8, 2012, Leavine defeated Apolo and Gilbert in a three-way match to win the WWC Universal Heavyweight Championship. On October 26, 2012, he competed against Wes Brisco and Ray Fénix in a winning effort in a non-title match. He wrestled a Loser Leaves WWC Match against Wes Brisco to a no-contest after Ray González interfered and attacked both of them at the same time. The following week, he lost to Brisco in an Anything Goes Loser Leaves WWC Match, which caused him to be kayfabe fired.

On April 27, 2013, Leavine and Samson Walker defeated Thunder & Lighting, winning the WWC Tag Team Championship. On June 29, 2013, at Summer Madness, Samson and Leavine lost the Tag Team titles to The Sons of Samoa (L.A. Smooth and Afa Jr.). At WWC 40 Aniversario, Leavine defeated Walker. Leavine retired from professional wrestling in 2014.

Championships and accomplishments 
World Wrestling Council
WWC Universal Heavyweight Championship (1 time)
WWC World Tag Team Championship (1 time) – with Samson Walker
WWE
Tough Enough V

References

External links 
 

1987 births
American male professional wrestlers
FIU Panthers football players
Living people
People from Brooksville, Florida
Professional wrestlers from Florida
Tough Enough winners
21st-century professional wrestlers
WWC Universal Heavyweight Champions